"So Far Away" is a song by American rock band Staind. It was released in June 2003 as the second single from their fourth album 14 Shades of Grey. The song enjoyed much success on both rock and mainstream radio, reaching number-one on the US Mainstream Rock Tracks for fourteen consecutive weeks, one of the longest runs in the chart's history, and number-one on the Modern Rock Tracks for seven non-consecutive weeks. The song also became the band's second top 40 hit on the Billboard Hot 100, peaking at number 24.

Reception
Bram Teitelman of Billboard reviewed the song favorably, predicting a rock radio smash due to "the lyrics' sunny disposition and a return to the sonic qualities that radio previously embraced." Teitelman called it a "midtempo song anchored by frontman Aaron Lewis' expressive vocals." Katherine Turman described the song as "an honest and grateful musing on success"; fans however feel that the song represents Aaron Lewis moving on in life and speaking of hope and uncertainty, along with the running theme of 14 Shades of Grey. The song was featured in the ninth episode of the third season of the series Smallville, and was used for a TV spot for the 2004 Marvel superhero film The Punisher.

Music video
The music video for the song was directed by Nigel Dick, and is a collage of clips of the band's live performances, some shots of Aaron Lewis' oldest daughter Zoe Jane (who was 1 at the time of filming), and other tour footage. It was filmed during a live performance at Freedom Hall in Louisville, KY.

Track listing

American release
"So Far Away"
"So Far Away" (Radio Edit)
"Novocaine" (Non Album Track)
"Zoe Jane" (Live at KROQ)

UK release
"So Far Away" (Radio Edit)
"Mudshovel" (Live)
"Home-Grown Promo Footage" (Multimedia)

Charts

References

2003 singles
Rock ballads
Staind songs
Music videos directed by Nigel Dick
2003 songs
Elektra Records singles
Songs written by Aaron Lewis
Song recordings produced by Josh Abraham
Songs written by Mike Mushok
2000s ballads